Kupchino is a station on the Moskovsko-Petrogradskaya Line of the Saint Petersburg Metro. It was opened on December 25, 1972. It was designed by K.N. Afonskya, A.C. Getskin and I.E. Sergeyeva. According to the original plans, the station was initially supposed to be called "Vitebskaya". The station received its final name after a small village Kupchino, that is located 2 km to the North of the station.

Kupchino is the oldest surviving above-ground station in Saint Peterburg (the since-demolished Dachnoye predates it by several years). It has a transfer link-up to Kupchino Station of the Vitebskya Railroad. It also has two exits to outside the station, as well as a long tunnel that leads to Vitebsky Prospect.

The most famous resident of Kupchino is arguably the third President and previous Prime Minister of Russia Dmitry Medvedev, who grew up in this area.  Another famous resident of the neighborhood is the mathematician Grigori Perelman.

Transit Connections 
 Electrichki - St Petersburg - Posyolok-Novolicino, St-Petersburg-Oredezh, St-Petersburg - Gdov Lines
 Tramway - Routes 25, 43, 45, 62
 Trolleybus - Routes 39, 47
 Municipal Bus - Routes 50, 53, 54, 56, 57, 74, 96, 157, 159
 Marshrutka - К-16, К-24, К-25, К-45, К-53, К-53а, К-56, К-59, К-82, К-96, К-113, К-139, К-151, К-201, К-216, К-217, К-246, К-250, К-253, К-286, К-292, К-293а, К-296, К-296а, К-345, К-347а, К-350, К-363, К-383, К-388, К-418, К-535, К-610, К-610а, К-688

Saint Petersburg Metro stations
Railway stations in Russia opened in 1972
1972 establishments in the Soviet Union